The 2014 Dubai World Cup was a horse race held at Meydan Racecourse on Saturday 29 March 2014. It was the 19th running of the Dubai World Cup.

The winner was Godolphin's African Story, a seven-year-old chestnut gelding trained in Dubai by Saeed bin Suroor and ridden by Silvestre de Sousa. African Story's victory was the first in the race for his jockey, the sixth for his trainer and the fifth for his owners.

African Story had begun his racing career in France before being sent to race in Dubai and had won four of his eight races on the synthetic Tapeta surface at Meydan. He had also finished behind Animal Kingdom in the 2013 running of the Dubai World Cup. For the 2014 running of the race he started at odds of 12/1 and won by two and three quarter lengths from the British-trained Mukhadram with Cat O'Mountain (also running for Godolphin) four and a quarter lengths back in third. The 3/1 favourite Military Attack finished tenth of the sixteen runners.

Race details
 Sponsor: Emirates Airline
 Purse: £6,024,096; First prize: £3,614,457
 Surface: Tapeta
 Going: Standard
 Distance: 10 furlongs
 Number of runners: 16
 Winner's time: 2:01.61

Full result

 Abbreviations: nse = nose; nk = neck; shd = head; hd = head

Winner's details
Further details of the winner, African Story
 Sex: Gelding
 Foaled: 10 March 2007
 Country: United Kingdom
 Sire: Pivotal; Dam: Blixen (Gone West)
 Owner: Godolphin
 Breeder: Darley Stud

References

Dubai World Cup
Dubai World Cup
Dubai World Cup
Dubai World Cup